Qin Wang (秦王, King/Prince of Qin or King/Prince Qin) may refer to:

Chinese royalty

Zhou dynasty
King Huiwen of Qin, ruled 338 BC – 311 BC, son of Duke Xiao of Qin
King Wu of Qin, ruled 310 BC – 307 BC
King Zhaoxiang of Qin, ruled 306 BC – 250 BC
King Xiaowen of Qin, ruled 250 BC – 249 BC
King Zhuangxiang of Qin, ruled 249 BC – 247 BC, father of Qin Shi Huang

Qin dynasty
Qin Shi Huang, ruled 246 BC – 221 BC as King of Qin before declaring as First Emperor
Fusu, first son of Qin Shi Huang who committed suicide
Ziying of Qin, claimed the reduced title King of Qin prior to the collapse of Qin dynasty

Sixteen Kingdoms
Fu Hong, self-proclaimed to be the Prince of Three Qins
Fú Jiàn, founding emperor of the Former Qin state
Yao Chang, self-proclaimed to be the Prince 10,000 Years of Qin
Dou Chong, Former Qin general who broke away in 393
Qifu Guoren, founding prince of the Western Qin state
Qifu Gangui, second prince of the Western Qin state
Qifu Chipan, third prince of the Western Qin state
Qifu Mumo, last prince of the Western Qin state

Southern and Northern Dynasties
Helian Chang, created in 430, former ruler of the Xia state

Sui dynasty
Yang Jun (prince) (died 600), third son of Emperor Yang of Sui
Yang Hao (prince) (died 618), puppet prince for Yuwen Huaji

Tang dynasty
Emperor Taizong of Tang, second emperor of Tang dynasty

Song dynasty
Qian Chu (posthumously), former king of Wuyue
Zhao Defang, fourth son of Emperor Taizu of Song

Yuan dynasty 

 Manggala (1249-1278), third son of Kublai
 Ananda (1273-1397), first son of Manggala
 Altan Buqa (d. 1323), second son of Manggala

Ming dynasty

Zhu Shuang (1356–1395), second son of the Hongwu Emperor

Games
Prince of Qin (video game)

See also
Qin (state)
Qin dynasty
Former Qin
Later Qin
Western Qin
Three Qins